Tris Vonna-Michell (born 1982) is a British artist who performs narratives and constructs installations through the layering of these narratives, photographs and mementos, presented using antiquated technologies and slide projection. Vonna-Michell lives in Southend in the United Kingdom and Stockholm, Sweden. He graduated from the Glasgow School of Art in 2005 and then continued his studies at the Städelschule, Frankfurt am Main

On 7 May 2014, it was announced that he was one of the four nominees for the Turner Prize.

Notable solo exhibitions

2010 No more racing in circles — just pacing within lines of a rectangle, Focal Point Gallery, Southend-on-Sea
2009 Halle für Kunst, Lüneburg
2009 Finding Chopin: Endnotes, Jeu de Paume Satellite, Paris
2009 Tensta Konsthall, Stockholm
2009 Auto-Tracking: Ongoing Configurations, Jan Mot, Brussels
2009 Tris Vonna-Michell, X-initiative, New York
2009 Auto-Tracking-Auto-Tracking, Kunsthalle Zürich, Zürich
2009 Studio A: Monumental Detours / Insignificant Fixtures, GAMeC, Bergamo
2008 Cabinet Gallery, London
2008 Auto-Tracking, Kunsthalle Zürich, Zürich
2008 The Trades of Others, T293, Naples
2007 Tall Tales and Short Stories, Cubitt, London
2007 Puzzlers, Kunstverein Braunschweig Cuboid, Braunschweig
2007 Tris Vonna-Michell, Witte de With, Rotterdam
2006 Faire un effort, Palais des Beaux-Arts, Brussels
2006 Down the Rabbit-Hole, Milliken Gallery, Stockholm

Prizes and awards
2008 Statements Art 39 Basel (with T293, Naples), Baloise Art Prize
2008 Ars Viva Prize

Residencies
2008 IASPIS Residency, Stockholm
2009 Focal Point Gallery Residency, Southend-on-Sea

Curated installations
2008 Three Minutes, Cubitt, London

References

External links
 Witte de With
 art facts
 degree critical
 Review of Tris Vonna-Michell Not a Solitary Sign or Inscription to Even Suggest an Ending at Overduin and Kite, The Brooklyn Rail

Living people
1982 births
British performance artists
Bâloise Prize winners
British contemporary artists